Robert Quirk Short (1759 – 31 January 1827) was a Church of England clergyman who emigrated to Canada in 1796. He was born at Withycombe Hall in Somerset, England.

External links
 Biography at the Dictionary of Canadian Biography

1759 births
1827 deaths
People from Somerset
Canadian Anglican priests
18th-century English Anglican priests
Alumni of the University of Oxford